S-Net (aka ShareNet) was a network operating system and the set of network protocols it used to talk to client machines on the network. Released by Novell in 1983, the S-Net operating system was an entirely proprietary operating system written for the Motorola 68000 processor. It used a star network topology.

S-Net has also been called NetWare 68, with the 68 denoting the 68000 processor. It was superseded by NetWare 86, which was written for the Intel 8086 processor, in 1985.

References 
 
 
 

Network operating systems
S-Net
Proprietary operating systems